Emilio Justin Behr (born 7 November 1995), better known by his stage name Justin Mylo, is a Dutch musician, DJ and record producer from Amsterdam. He gained recognition after working and collaborating with Martin Garrix on the single "Bouncybob".

Career 
As a teenager, he performed at local clubs as a DJ. In 2015, he was featured on Garrix's single "Bouncybob" in production alongside Mesto.

Discography

Extended plays

Singles

References 

Dutch DJs
DJs from Amsterdam
Future house musicians
Deep house musicians
Dutch electronic musicians
Living people
Spinnin' Records artists
1995 births
Electronic dance music DJs
Stmpd Rcrds artists